Vuilendam  is a hamlet in Molenlanden, which is a municipality in the Dutch province of South Holland. Vuilendam lies between Molenaarsgraaf and Ottoland.

References 
 Equivalent article on the Dutch Wikipedia.

Populated places in South Holland
Molenlanden